"Flatline" is a song by American rapper B.o.B, initially released on SoundCloud in January 2016. It is a diss track aimed at physicist Neil DeGrasse Tyson, whom he had gotten into an argument with on Twitter, over B.o.B's stated belief that the Earth is flat. In addition to dissing Tyson and expressing belief in a flat Earth, the song's lyrics also include other conspiracy theories, including Holocaust denial, "mirror lizards", and the belief that Freemasons are indoctrinating young people. The lyrics to the song refer to science as a cult.

Reception 
The song was panned by critics and music industry commentators for its support of conspiracy theories and its anti-Semitism. Vulture music critic Nate Jones commented, "It’s called 'Flatline,' which is both a reference to the horizon of the Earth and also a fitting description of B.o.B’s career." Jonathan Greenblatt, the CEO of the Anti-Defamation League, issued a statement saying that B.o.B's "lyrics are irresponsible and could potentially promote anti-Semitic beliefs, especially in those people who might already be infected by such notions."

Online music database Rate Your Music has marked the single as Neo-Nazi content due to the anti-Semitic conspiracies promoted in the lyrics.

Following criticism, B.o.B removed the song from his SoundCloud account, but it survives on YouTube and other sites where it was reposted. In April 2016, B.o.B included the song on a mixtape titled E.A.R.T.H. (Educational Avatar Reality Training Habitat), but the song lyrics had been rewritten as titled as pt. 2.

In response to B.o.B's Twitter arguments with Neil deGrasse Tyson, the latter's nephew, an amateur rapper using the stage name Ellect, released a diss track of his own titled "Flat to Fact" which echoes several of his uncle's talking points and features Tyson himself providing spoken word interjections.

References

2016 songs
Anti-Masonry
B.o.B songs
Conspiracy theories in popular culture
Criticism of science
David Irving
Diss tracks
Flat Earth
Holocaust denial
Neil deGrasse Tyson
Obscenity controversies in music
Political rap songs
Song recordings produced by B.o.B
Songs written by B.o.B